Gora may refer to:

Gora (surname)
Gora (musical instrument), or lesiba, a South African instrument
Gora (novel), a 1910 novel by Rabindranath Tagore
Gora (TV series), a 2022 Indian Bengali-language streaming series
G.O.R.A., a 2004 Turkish comedy film
Goparaju Ramachandra Rao ("Gora", 1902–1975), Indian social reformer and atheist activist

Places
Gora (region), in southern Kosovo and north-eastern Albania
Gora, Croatia, a village near Petrinja, Croatia
Góra (disambiguation), places in Poland
Gora, Russia, several rural localities in Russia
Gora (Kakanj), a village in Bosnia and Herzegovina
Gora (Vogošća), a village in Bosnia and Herzegovina
Gora, Krško, a settlement in the Municipality of Krško, Slovenia
Gora nad Sodražico (also known as Gora), Slovenia, a community and parish comprising the villages of Betonovo, Kračali, Janeži, Petrinci, and Kržeti
Gora Ardan, a peak in the western plains of Turkmenistan
Gora Cemetery (disambiguation)
Gōra Station, a railway station in Hakone, Japan

See also
Goura (disambiguation)
Nova Gora (disambiguation)